Tony Debray (born 13 November 1989) is a French male canoeist who won 20 medals at senior level at the Wildwater Canoeing World Championships.

Medals at the World Championships
Senior

References

External links
 

1989 births
Living people
French male canoeists
Place of birth missing (living people)